Vitaly Mikhailovich Medvedev (born 7 May 1983) is a fencer who specializes in the épée. He was born in the Uzbek SSR, Soviet Union. His family then moved to the Lithuanian SSR, and in 1990 to Crimea, Ukrainian SSR, where he started fencing at the age of 11.He competed at the 2008 Summer Olympics and finished in seventh place with the Ukrainian team. In 2013, he won a silver and a bronze medal in the team épée at the world and European championships, respectively.

His parents are former basketball players. His mother, Emilia Kudusovna Medvedeva, worked as a teacher.

References

1983 births
Living people
Fencers at the 2008 Summer Olympics
Olympic fencers of Ukraine
Ukrainian male épée fencers
Universiade medalists in fencing
Universiade bronze medalists for Ukraine
Medalists at the 2009 Summer Universiade